Steven Soper is a racing driver from Surrey, England, born in 1951.

He raced in major sports car and touring car categories in the 1980s and 1990s.  He won the 24 Hours Nürburgring in 1987, the 24 Hours of Spa in 1995 and the Guia Race in 1997 – many of which through his longest association, with BMW.

Career 
Across just over two decades Soper won three major races: the 24 Hours Nürburgring in 1987, the 24 Hours of Spa in 1995 and the Guia Race in 1997.

Soper had been successful in one make series, before making his British Saloon Car Championship debut in 1982 in an Austin Metro. His talent was spotted by Tom Walkinshaw and he joined TWR in 1983. He won the championship in his first season with the works Austin Rover team but rival Frank Sytner protested the TWR team and his Rover Vitesse was later deemed illegal due to an issue with the engine installation. TWR was disqualified and the title was awarded to Andy Rouse. He later joined Eggenberger Motorsport and finished as runner-up in the series in 1988 in a Ford Sierra RS500 Cosworth, enjoying many on-track battles with Andy Rouse in the process.

Soper challenged for the title in 1991, finishing 4th and in 1993, finishing as runner up behind teammate Joachim Winkelhock for BMW. Soper had led the championship for most of the season but a run of bad luck towards the end of the year damaged his title challenge. During the season finale of the 1992 championship, Soper was involved in the infamous collision with John Cleland, which cost Cleland the title and famously led him to label Soper 'an animal'. 1995 saw Soper race in the Japanese Super Touring championship for Schnitzer BMW, winning the championship outright that year.

Soper raced in the German Super Tourenwagen Cup in 1996, challenging for the title until an incident late in the season with his team mate ended his championship chances. He finished second overall to Emanuele Pirro. In 1997 he came second in the FIA GT Championship. Soper finished fifth driving a Ford Sierra for Eggenberger Motorsport in the one-off World Touring Car Championship in 1987 run under Group A regulations. That year, he won the Bathurst 1000, but was later disqualified for a technical infringement
Soper was offered a works drive for BMW, and competed in the night European, Japanese and German Touring Car Championships. During the 1999 24 Hours of Le Mans, he expressed dislike of the 24-hour classic race, established in the early 20th century.

By 2000, Soper fell out of favour with Gerhard Berger, who was in charge of BMW's motorsport operations and retired from racing as he was solely interested in racing BMWs and acquired a BMW dealership in Lincoln. For 2001, he reluctantly made a surprise return to the British Touring Car Championship with Peugeot. The car's build rendered it less successful than the Vauxhall Astra.  He finished 6th in a thin field and was advised to retire on medical grounds after a heavy crash in the final round.

In 2013, Soper, who had earned the nickname "Soperman" (with final syllable stress to sound like "superman") from his fans during his career, announced plans, on medical clearance, to race.

Soper was voted the greatest saloon car driver ever by readers of Motor Sport.

Racing record

Complete British Saloon / Touring Car Championship results
(key) (Races in bold indicate pole position – 1973–1990 in class) (Races in italics indicate fastest lap – 1 point awarded ?–1989 in class)

 – Race was stopped due to heavy rain. No points were awarded.

† Events with 2 races staged for the different classes.

‡ Endurance driver.

Complete European Touring Car Championship results
Source:

(key) (Races in bold indicate pole position) (Races in italics indicate fastest lap)

† Not eligible for points.

Complete World Touring Car Championship results
(key) (Races in bold indicate pole position) (Races in italics indicate fastest lap)

* Overall race position shown. Registered WTCC points paying position may differ.

Complete Deutsche Tourenwagen Meisterschaft results
(key) (Races in bold indicate pole position) (Races in italics indicate fastest lap)

Complete Asia-Pacific Touring Car Championship results
(key) (Races in bold indicate pole position) (Races in italics indicate fastest lap)

† Not eligible for points.

Complete Italian Touring Car Championship results
(key) (Races in bold indicate pole position) (Races in italics indicate fastest lap)

Complete Japanese Touring Car Championship results
(key) (Races in bold indicate pole position) (Races in italics indicate fastest lap)

Complete Super Tourenwagen Cup results
Source:
(key) (Races in bold indicate pole position; races in italics indicate fastest lap)

Complete Bathurst 1000 results

* 1987 finished 1st on the road but later disqualified.

24 Hours of Le Mans results

Macau Grand Prix Guia Race results

References

External links
Driver DB Profile
Official Steve Soper Website

English racing drivers
British Touring Car Championship drivers
World Touring Car Championship drivers
Japanese Touring Car Championship drivers
Living people
1951 births
Deutsche Tourenwagen Masters drivers
24 Hours of Le Mans drivers
American Le Mans Series drivers
World Sportscar Championship drivers
24 Hours of Spa drivers
European Touring Car Championship drivers
BMW M drivers
Schnitzer Motorsport drivers
Peugeot Sport drivers
Jaguar Racing drivers
David Price Racing drivers
Nürburgring 24 Hours drivers